Mohammed Tahir was a Pakistani police officer who served as the Inspector General of Police in Punjab. Prior to his appointment as IG for Punjab, he served as IG Khyber Pakhtunkhwa. A 16th batch of civil services, he originally joined police service in 1988 as an assistant superintendent.

References

Pakistani police officers
Living people
Pashtun people
Year of birth missing (living people)